Bridget Kearney (kə́ːnɪj, car'-nee) is an American musician and songwriter. She is a founding member of the band Lake Street Dive and winner of the 2005 John Lennon Songwriting Contest in the Jazz category.

Kearney's solo recording work began with her debut solo album, Won't Let You Down, released by Signature Sounds Recordings in 2017 followed by a number of singles released on YouTube, social media sites such as Instagram.

Biography

Early life, influences and education 

Kearney was born and grew up in Iowa City, Iowa. Her mother played flute. She started her journey with music in the Lutheran Church's Cherub choir. Kearney took piano lessons at the age of 5 and began playing bass in the 4th grade. She listened to her parent's rock and roll records from the 1960's and gained an appreciation of the Beatles' music. In high school, she played in the school orchestras and jazz bands and had her own rock and roll band. At 13, Kearney and her band, MetroPilot, won a songwriting contest for a song called "Live" about the dangers of tobacco, where the prize was to perform the song in front of a live audience including keynote speaker and former United States Surgeon General C. Everett Koop. Bridget fronted the band playing electric bass and singing lead vocals. 

In interviews she recalls how her jazz band director in high school, Rich Medd, always made class fun saying, "I was always excited to go to jazz band rehearsal and that is one of the reasons I’m still playing music."

Already an accomplished and devoted bass player at a young age, Kearney played electric bass through junior high school, after which she moved to jazz music and switched to an upright or double bass until age 35 when Kearney acquired a number of electric bass guitars and other gear which expanded her sound. 

Kearney's knowledge, skills and innate capacity for creativity took her to a much higher musical level while studying with Mark Urness, a versatile bassist, composer, and educator in Iowa City at the time who later moved to teaching at Lawrence University in Wisconsin. Her early bass influences were Paul Chambers, Charles Mingus and Charlie Haden. 

In college Kearney double majored, studying jazz bass at the New England Conservatory of Music and English at Tufts University. As a sophomore, she played with two bands she helped found: Joy Kills Sorrow and Lake Street Dive.

Personal interests 
Kearney likes to play tennis and run to stay fit and raise money for her favorite charities. She often seeks adventure on the road, like bungee jumping in New Zealand, and is a master of chipology. She once held the one-game record for selling the most (105) foam fingers during a Boston Red Sox game at Fenway Park.

Songwriting 
As a songwriter/composer she has registered over 85 songs as a member of Broadcast Music, Inc. Of those, at least 25 are held solely by her, and the rest with different songwriters/composers and artists including Lake Street Dive, Cuddle Magic, Joy Kills Sorrow, Benjamin Lazar Davis and Margaret Glaspy.

Kearney is a skilled songwriting instructor who taught private lessons online for charity and also taught songwriting to larger classes online with "School of Song", a community-concept based songwriting school with rotating instructors where she was also a student. She has been co-teaching a songwriting class with Paul Muldoon at Princeton University. She credits some of her song writing acumen to authors such as Ernest Hemingway, having once been quoted as saying "A lot of my ideals as a songwriter come from novelists and poets, like Hemingway's idea that to start writing a story, all you have to do is write one true sentence. A song works that way too. You just need to find one seed the rest will grow from there."

Bands

Lake Street Dive 
Kearney is a founding member of Lake Street Dive, which started touring in 2007. She has appeared with Lake Street Dive on many national shows: The Colbert Report, The Late Show with David Letterman, Conan, The Ellen DeGeneres Show, National Public Radio, Prairie Home Companion with Garrison Keillor and in the first show hosted by Chris Thile, now called Live From Here. The band has uploaded numerous videos, including their annual, humorous Halloween covers, and T Bone Burnett asked them to perform on the Another Day, Another Time: Celebrating the Music of "Inside Llewyn Davis". The band has traveled and performed in almost every state and over a dozen foreign countries. Originally with Signature Sounds Recordings, in 2016 the band signed with Nonesuch Records and subsequently released their "Fun Machine: The Sequel EP" on Fantasy Records in September of 2022.

BB Wisely 
Kearney launched the band BB Wisely with Benjamin Lazar Davis and Will Graefe in August 2022. The trio had been writing songs, recording and touring as a trio and alternating duo pairs for a few years prior to deciding on BB Wisely as the name of the band. The band name is a fusion of Bridget, Ben, and "Chime Wisely", a band created by Davis and guitarist Will Graefe.

The Bridget Kearney Band 
Kearney has worked with a varying array of other musicians, producers and performers to create her own recordings, videos and tour, solely performing her own music under her own name. Other tours were designed as collaborations with varying musicians each taking the lead role in arranging and performing their own songs with the other members backing and exchanging instruments. These appearances were sometimes referred to under the name of each, or all, performers.

Bridget Kearney and Benjamin Lazar Davis 
Bridget Kearney and Benjamin Lazar Davis began making music together performing as "BbGun" from the time they were students together at the New England Conservatory of Music. In 2015 the two alumni teamed up to create original works which are in part a fusion of music from the west African country of Ghana and Kearney and Davis' music. Various artists, including Stevo Atambire and Aaron Bebe Sukura as well as musical instruments and cultural elements from Ghana were used by the artists from Ghana, Kearney and Davis in the making of these recordings. The results of these creative efforts are contained in two recorded music releases: "Bawa" in 2015 and "Still Flying" in 2020.

Joy Kills Sorrow 
Kearney was also a major songwriter and stand up bass player for Joy Kills Sorrow from 2005 to 2012. Joy Kills Sorrow was a Boston-based, indie pop, American roots, string band formed in 2005. This band released three albums before Kearney left the band to join Lake Street Dive full-time.

Cuddle Magic 
Cuddle Magic is a chamber pop collective that varies in membership. Kearney has written songs for and played with Cuddle Magic.

The Fundies 
The Fundies was another part-time band collaboration featuring Margaret Glaspy, Rachael Price, Brittany Haas and Kearney. Their first performance was in 2010, and they self-released an EP called The Fundies in 2012. Glaspy and Haas played a Fundies reunion gig in 2015.

Discography

Solo

Albums 
 Won't Let You Down (2017)

Singles 
 I Bet UR (Nov 2021)
 So Badly (Dec 2021)
 Diary Fire (Feb 2022)
 All This Time (Mar 2022)

With Lake Street Dive 
 In This Episode (2006)
 Promises, Promises (2007)
 Live at the Lizard Lounge (Video) (2011)
 Lake Street Dive (S/T) (2011) 
 Fun Machine (album) (2012) 
 Bad Self Portraits (album) (2014)
 Side Pony (album) (2016)
 Free Yourself Up (Early 2018)
 Freak Yourself Out (Late 2018)
 Obviously (album) (2021)
 Fun Machine: The Sequel (EP) (Sep 2022)

With BB Wisely 
 Coal Canary (Aug 2022)

With Benjamin Lazar Davis 
 BAWA (2015)
 Still Flying (2020)

With Joy Kills Sorrow 
 Darkness Sure Becomes This City (2010)
 This Unknown Science (2011)

With The Fundies 
 The Fundies EP (2012)

References

External links 
Bridget Kearney
Lake Street Dive
 Bridget Kearney and Benjamin Lazar Davis

Living people
1986 births
New England Conservatory alumni
Tufts University School of Arts and Sciences alumni
American multi-instrumentalists
American double-bassists
21st-century American composers
American women composers
People from Iowa City, Iowa
21st-century American women musicians
Signature Sounds artists
Iowa City West High School alumni
21st-century women composers
Lake Street Dive members
The Fundies members
Nonesuch Records artists